Broughton West is a civil parish in the South Lakeland District of Cumbria, England.  It contains 39 listed buildings that are recorded in the National Heritage List for England.  Of these, two are listed at Grade II*, the middle of the three grades, and the others are at Grade II, the lowest grade.  The parish contains the market town of Broughton-in-Furness and a number of small villages and settlements, including Broughton Mills, but is otherwise rural.  Many of the listed buildings are located in Broughton-in-Furness, and the others are scattered around the parish.  Most of the listed buildings are country houses, smaller houses and associated structures, and farmhouses and farm buildings.  The other listed buildings include a church and items in the churchyard, bridges, public houses, a former market hall, a commemorative obelisk, stocks, a limekiln and market benches.


Key

Buildings

Notes and references

Notes

Citations

Sources

Lists of listed buildings in Cumbria